is a town in Satsuma District, Kagoshima Prefecture, Japan.

The town was formed March 22, 2005 from the merger of the towns of Miyanojō, Tsuruda, and a former town with the English name of Satsuma (薩摩町), all from Satsuma District.

As of August 2011, the town has an estimated population of 23,842. The total area is 303.43 km².

Geography

Climate
Satsuma has a humid subtropical climate (Köppen climate classification Cfa) with hot summers and mild winters. Precipitation is significant throughout the year, and is heavier in summer, especially the months of June and July.

Demographics
Per Japanese census data, the population of Satsuma in 2020 is 20,243 people. The town's population has been slowly declining since Satsuma's census began in 1950, and the town's population shows no sign of picking up as of 2020.

References

External links

  

Towns in Kagoshima Prefecture